Ospedaletto may refer to several locations in Italy:

 Ospedaletto, Trentino
 Ospedaletto d'Alpinolo
 Ospedaletto Euganeo
 Ospedaletto Lodigiano
 Ospedaletto, a village divided between the comuni of Vicenza and Bolzano Vicentino

See also
 Chiesa del Ospedaletto, a church in Venice
 San Diego all'Ospedaletto, Naples
 Ospedaletti, a comune in Liguria